Mighty Joe Young is a 1998 American epic adventure film based on the 1949 film of the same name about a giant mountain gorilla brought to a wildlife preserve in Los Angeles by a young woman who raised him, and a zoologist, to protect him from the threat of poachers until one seeks Joe out in order to take his revenge. It was directed by Ron Underwood and stars Bill Paxton, Charlize Theron, and creature suit actor John Alexander as the title character. In this version, the ape is much larger than in the original. The film received mixed reviews and grossed $50.6 million in the United States against a production budget of $90 million.

Plot

As a child, Jill Young witnesses the death of her mother, primatologist Ruth Young, and the mother of Joe, an infant mountain gorilla, at the hands of poachers led by Andrei Strasser, who loses his right thumb and trigger finger to Joe, swearing revenge.

As a result, other gorillas will not accept him and they are both now living in relative peace until a wildlife refuge director, Gregg O'Hara, convinces Jill that they would be safer from poachers if they relocated to the United States.

The trio goes to Los Angeles and win the hearts of the refuge staff at the conservancy, who put Jill in charge of Joe. Jill meets Strasser, who now runs a fraudulent animal preserve in Botswana, while secretly selling animal organs on the black market, and is eager for revenge after seeing Joe featured on a news report. At first, Jill does not recognize him, since his right hand is concealed in his coat pocket. Strasser attempts to convince Jill that Joe would be better off in his wildlife refuge back in Africa. During a gala, Strasser's henchman Garth uses a poacher's noisemaker to scare Joe into a frenzy. Joe trashes the gala, with the intention of attacking Strasser, but is captured, and imprisoned in a concrete bunker.

When Jill discovers that Joe may be euthanized, she accepts Strasser's offer. She and the refuge staff smuggle Joe out in a truck. Before their departure, Gregg, who has fallen in love with Jill, kisses her goodbye. Shortly after Jill leaves, the maintenance workers come in with the poacher's noisemaker that they found while cleaning up the gala, making Gregg realize Jill and Joe are in danger and he drives after them.

On the way to the airport, Jill notices the half-glove covering Strasser's missing fingers and recognizes him. She fights Strasser and Garth, then jumps from the truck onto Hollywood Boulevard, leading to several automobile accidents. Joe sees her and tilts the truck over onto its side and flees, wreaking havoc in the Hollywood city and being chased by helicopters, before arriving at the Santa Monica Pier carnival.

Gregg finds Jill, who tells him of Strasser's intentions and her history with him. They track Joe to the carnival where he is playfully wreaking havoc. Strasser, determined to prevent Jill from exposing him, arrives and attempts to shoot her. But Garth, appalled at Strasser's ruthlessness, turns against him and shoves the gun away from Jill, causing Strasser to misfire at a spotlight, which starts a fire that quickly spreads throughout the carnival. After knocking Garth unconscious, Strasser attempts to kill Jill in person, but Joe sneaks up behind them and throws the evil poacher onto a nearby power line.  Unable to grip the wire due to his missing fingers, Strasser falls onto a transformer below and is electrocuted to death, leaving only his prosthetic half-glove dangling from the cable.

Later, Joe attempts to save a child, who he had earlier bonded with while en route to the conservancy, from atop the burning Ferris wheel, but the fire burns it down and Joe and the child fall to the ground, where Joe jumps off of the burning wheel, protecting the boy and knocking himself unconscious. Joe survives the fall and awakens, and Jill mentions that they need to raise money to open a reserve for him. The young boy named Jason donates some change to Jill after hearing this, prompting nearby civilians to contribute.

Joe is returned to Uganda where Jill and Gregg open the "Joe Young Reserve". Finally free, Joe runs off into the jungle.

Cast

Bill Paxton as Professor Gregory "Gregg" O'Hara, a zoologist who finds Joe in the wild and develops a relationship with Jill.
Charlize Theron as Jill Young, a young woman who is Joe's best friend and protecter after they were both orphaned by the same poacher.
Mika Boorem as Young Jill Young
He is Jill's best friend since they were orphaned by the same poacher. Joe was designed and created by special makeup effects legend Rick Baker.
Verne Troyer as Baby Joe Young
Mighty Joe Young puppeteers: Mark Setrakian, Mike Elizalde, Jurgen Heimann, Steven Sherman
Rade Šerbedžija as Andrei Strasser, a ruthless Romanian poacher who is seeking retribution on Joe after he bit off his thumb and index finger when he was an infant. He is also the poacher who murdered both Jill's and Joe's mothers.
Regina King as Cecily Banks, a zoologist and Gregg's friend working at the wildlife preserve who immediately befriends Jill and Joe.
Peter Firth as Garth, Strasser's South African lieutenant, who isn't as ruthless as Strasser.
Naveen Andrews as Pindi, a local guide and employee of Strasser.
David Paymer as Harry Ruben, the supervisor at the wildlife preserve that Joe is relieved to.
Robert Wisdom as Kweli, a local African man who was a friend of Jill's mother and a surrogate father figure to Jill.
Christian Clemenson as Jack
Geoffrey Blake as Vern
Lawrence Pressman as Doctor Elliot Baker
Linda Purl as Doctor Ruth Young, Jill's primatologist mother who was murdered by Strasser and Garth.
Cory Buck as Jason, a young boy who gets caught on the burning Ferris wheel.
Richard Riehle as Commander Gorman
Ray Harryhausen as Gentleman at Party
Terry Moore as Elegant Woman at Party
Judson Mills as Impatient Driver
Tony Genaro as Boxer Shorts Man
Marguerite Moreau as Lisa
Tracey Walter as Conservancy Guard
Larry Brandenburg as Animal Control Duty Officer
Damien Leake as Cop
Richard McGonagle as Panda Owner
Reno Wilson as Poacher
Dina Merrill as Society Woman
Lily Mariye as Ticket Clerk
Debbie Lee Carrington as Other Gorilla
Scarlett Pomers as Charlotte
Claire Danes as Woman In AEC Routemaster,

Production
The project was set up in March 1995 by Joe Roth and Disney Pictures president David Vogel. Pre-production started with Rick Baker designing the gorilla and DreamQuest in charge of computer graphic imagery. Charlize Theron was cast in April 1997.

Cinematographer Donald Peterman suffered head injuries, a broken leg and broken ribs in a crane accident on the film set in 1997. His camera platform plummeted  to the ground when the crane snapped. Camera operator, Ray De la Motte, sitting next to Peterman on the crane, was also injured in the accident.

In most of the film, Joe was portrayed by creature-suit performer John Alexander, who wore a radio-controlled animatronic gorilla mask and full body suit created by special makeup effects artist Rick Baker and his crew at Cinovation Studios. To achieve those scenes, Alexander often acted on miniature sets surrounded by blue screen; visual-effects house DreamQuest Images then composited him into footage shot earlier. Joe as an infant was performed by Verne Troyer. For certain scenes, the filmmakers used three full-sized animatronics (one in quadruped, one sitting down, and one in a dead position) also created by Baker's crew. For the digital Joe, visual-effects houses DreamQuest Images and Industrial Light & Magic worked on different scenes, using the same model provided by Baker. Many of these performances were achieved by key-frame animation, but to portray the digital Joe running and jumping, motion-capture data from an infant chimpanzee were used.

Music
The music for the film was composed and conducted by James Horner. The soundtrack was released on December 8, 1998.

Release and reception
The film grossed $50.6 million against a production budget of $90 million. and holds a rating of 54% from Rotten Tomatoes based on 54 reviews, with an average rating of 5.9/10. The site's critical consensus is: "Beguiling effects transcend a predictable plot." Metacritic assigned a weighted average rating of 51 out of 100, based on 20 critics, indicating "mixed or average reviews". Audiences polled by CinemaScore gave the film an average grade of "B+" on an A+ to F scale.

Roger Ebert of the Chicago Sun-Times gave the film 3 stars out of 4, saying, "Mighty Joe Young is an energetic, robust adventure tale: not too cynical, violent or fragmented for kids, not too tame for adults. After all the calculation behind "Godzilla" or "Armageddon," it has a kind of innocence. It's not about a monster but about a very big, well-meaning gorilla that just wants to be left in peace." Despite giving the film positive reviews, he also pointed out that the romance scenes and villains were only average and by no means exceptional. Common Sense Media gave the film 4 stars, finding that the "environmentally-friendly" film provides "serious food for thought [and] plenty of comic relief", as opposed to the 1949 RKO film. The reviewer praised the effects and acting that went into Joe's rendition, saying that children will sympathize with the character, as well as with Theron's and Paxton's romantic pairing.

James Berardinelli gave the film 3 stars out of 4, and generally positive reviews: "Although Joe's size makes him a monster, his disposition makes him cuddly. Despite not being daring in style or story, Mighty Joe Young is nevertheless a charming and enjoyable adventure, and a rare remake that's better than the original. It may not have the box office punch to exceed the $100 million mark, but it's good enough to entertain an audience." Colin Fraser of eFilm Critic gave it 3 stars, saying, "Strictly for ten-year-olds, Mighty Joe Young has its ample heart in exactly the right place. After an opening sequence that will have kiddies reaching for Kleenex, the action soon picks up with many a thrill on the way. This is not Jurassic Park however and doesn't really deserve its Academy nomination for effects."

Among those who criticized the film included Maitland McDonagh of TV Guide, who gave the film 2.5 stars out of 4. McDonagh believed it would be too shallow for adult viewers and too serious for children, adding that "Joe himself is an amazing creation, less personable, to be sure, than the original lovelorn King Kong, but a far more fully realized character than any of the flesh and blood humans by whom he's surrounded." Paul Clinton of CNN gave it negative reviews, saying, "Great scenery, cartoonish villains, huges leaps of suspended belief, and mouthwatering shots of Charlize Theron are in plentiful supply in Mighty Joe Young. And baby, can this boy travel. He goes from Africa to L.A. in just one dissolve. Then when he escapes he goes from Hollywood Boulevard, to the Los Angeles river, to the Pacific Palisades in seconds. If you're not familiar with L.A ... trust me ... couldn't happen." and "The gorilla is pretty impressive and expressive, but overall it's much ado about -- not much. I have a feeling this film will be fairly low on the food chain of "must see" holiday films."

Stephen Holden of The New York Times gave the film generally unfavorable reviews, saying, "Mighty Joe Young, directed by Ron Underwood from a screenplay by Mark Rosenthal and Lawrence Konner, is saddled with dialogue so wooden that Mr. Paxton and Ms. Theron almost seem animatronic themselves. Little children won't notice. In Joe, they can identify with the biggest, cuddliest simian toy a 6-year-old could ever hope to own." Dustin Putman gave it 2 stars out of 4 and a negative review, saying, "Mighty Joe Young is an agreeable time-waster for older kids (it's much too violent for the youngest viewers) and perhaps some adults, but in a season when children could also choose to see the marvelous The Prince of Egypt, and adults could pick any number of far superior films, Mighty Joe Young simply pales in comparison. Although you could certainly do much worse, there is only one really distinctive quality about the film, and that is Charlize Theron's charismatic performance."

Mighty Joe Young also received an Academy Award nomination for Best Visual Effects, losing to What Dreams May Come.

See also
 List of American films of 1998
 List of fictional primates
 King Kong, 2005 film

References

External links
 
 
 
 

1998 films
1990s adventure drama films
American adventure drama films
1990s children's adventure films
1990s monster movies
Remakes of American films
American monster movies
American children's adventure films
Films about gorillas
Fictional gorillas
Films about giants
Films set in Uganda
Films set in Los Angeles
Films shot in Hawaii
Films shot in Los Angeles
RKO Pictures films
Walt Disney Pictures films
Films directed by Ron Underwood
Films scored by James Horner
1990s English-language films
1990s American films